The 2005 Women's World Amateur Boxing Championships was an international women's boxing competition hosted by Russia from September 25 to October 2, 2005 in Podolsk. It was the 3rd championship, which debuted 2001 in Scranton, Pennsylvania, United States.

The World Championship was contested in 13 weight disciplines by 152 amateur woman boxers from 28 countries.

Russia won seven gold, one silver and four bronze medals, while Canada finished second with one gold, one silver and two bronze medals, followed by India with a tally of 1-0-4. The Canadian, Mary Spencer (66 kg) was awarded "Best Boxer of the Competition".

Participating nations

Results

Medal count table

References

External links
Results

Women's World Amateur Boxing Championships, 2005
Women's World Boxing Championships
Boxing
Boxing
Boxing
2005 in women's boxing
October 2005 sports events in Europe